Odostomia navarettei is a species of sea snail, a marine gastropod mollusc in the family Pyramidellidae, the pyrams and their allies.

Distribution
This species occurs in the Pacific Ocean off San José Island, Gulf of California.

References

External links
 To World Register of Marine Species
 To ITIS

navarettei
Gastropods described in 1928